Yasantha Kodagoda (born in 1965 in Sri Lanka) is a Puisne Justice of the Supreme Court of the Democratic Socialist Republic of Sri Lanka. He was called to the Bar as an Attorney-at-Law of the Supreme Court of Sri Lanka on 28 October 1988. Prior to being appointed by the President of Sri Lanka as the President of the Court of Appeal in March 2019 (following a unanimous approval of his nomination by the Constitutional Council), he served as an Additional Solicitor General of the Attorney General's Department. Having joined the Attorney General's Department of Sri Lanka in 1989 as a State Counsel, he rose to the positions of Senior State Counsel (1999), Deputy Solicitor General (2005), Senior Deputy Solicitor General (2014) and Additional Solicitor General (2015). He has 30+ years of experience as a Public Prosecutor and Legal Advisor to the Government of Sri Lanka. His specialization is in the field of criminal justice. In 2015, in recognition of his eminence in the legal profession, he was appointed President's Counsel. He completed his primary and secondary education at Ananda College Colombo he was a president Scout of ananda college and then attended Sri Lanka Law College. He obtained Master's degree in Public International Law with Merit (LL.M.) from  the University College London (UCL) He acted as the Director of the Advanced Legal Studies Unit of the Sri Lanka Law College and the Director of the Institute of Advanced Legal Studies (Sri Lanka) of the Incorporated Council of Legal Education. He has served many Commissions of Inquiry as representative Counsel of the Attorney General. For over a decade, he has represented Sri Lanka before the UN Human Rights Commission and the UN Human Rights Council. He has also represented Sri Lanka before the UN Security Council's Working Group on Children in Armed Conflict, and has served as the Accredited Representative of the Government of Sri Lanka at the UN Committee Against Torture. He was a member of the EU-Sri Lanka Working Group on Trade and Economic Relations Cooperation 2016 and actively participated in Sri Lanka gaining the GSP+ trade concessions. Kodagoda is known as a book reviewer

See also
 Attorney General's Department

References

Sinhalese lawyers
Sri Lankan Buddhists
President's Counsels (Sri Lanka)
Living people
Alumni of Sri Lanka Law College
21st-century Sri Lankan people
1965 births
Puisne Justices of the Supreme Court of Sri Lanka